Plaaslike Besorgde Inwoners (Concerned Local Residents) is a minor political party based in George, South Africa.

The party focuses on corruption, and contested the 2016 municipal elections, earning 3.3% of the proportional representation vote in the George area, and earning 2 seats in the George Local Municipality. In 2021, the party increased this to 10% and five seats, and also won a seat in the Knysna Local Municipality.

In January 2018, party leader Virgil Gericke called for the George Local Municipality to be placed under administration following infighting within the governing Democratic Alliance and that party's failure to elect replacement councillors following the dismissal of the council's Speaker, Chief Whip and four councillors by Local Government Minister, Anton Bredell.

The party contested the 2019 South African general election at provincial level in the Eastern Cape and Western Cape only, failing to win a seat.

Election results

Provincial elections

! rowspan=2 | Election
! colspan=2 | Eastern Cape
! colspan=2 | Free State
! colspan=2 | Gauteng
! colspan=2 | Kwazulu-Natal
! colspan=2 | Limpopo
! colspan=2 | Mpumalanga
! colspan=2 | North-West
! colspan=2 | Northern Cape
! colspan=2 | Western Cape
|-
! % !! Seats
! % !! Seats
! % !! Seats
! % !! Seats
! % !! Seats
! % !! Seats
! % !! Seats
! % !! Seats
! % !! Seats
|-
! 2019
| 0.03% || 0/63
| - || -
| - || -
| - || -
| - || -
| - || -
| - || -
| - || -
| 0.19% || 0/42
|}

Municipal elections

|-
! Election
! Votes
! %
! Seats
|-
! 2011
| 3,241
| 0.01%
| 1
|-
! 2016
| 7,583
| 0.02%
| 2
|-
! 2021
| 19,563
| 0.06%
| 6
|-
|}

References

Political parties in South Africa